The General Directorate for National Roads and Motorways is the central authority of national administration set up to manage the national roads and implementation of the state budget in Poland. The GDDKiA was established on 1 April 2002 by the Polish Ministry of Transportation.

The directorate was formed by a consolidation of the:
 General Directorate of Roads (est. 23 March 1951)
 Public Agency for Construction and the Operations of Motorways (est. 8 June 1995).

The head of administration of the GDDKiA is the Director-General of National Roads and Motorways. The GDDKiA consists of 16 provincial branches and also the Regional Country Roads offices, which manage roads in their territories. In addition the Directorate-General of the History of Roads resides in Szczucin, and is responsible for preserving any road monuments.

The GDDKiA is the central government body responsible for national roads and also performs the duties of:
 Participation in the implementation of road transport policy
 Collection of data and information about the network of public roads
 Supervising the preparation of road infrastructure for the defense of the nation
 Issuing permits for a single journey, within a specified time and for a fixed route, of non-standard vehicles
 Cooperating with other road administrations and international organizations
 Cooperation with local governments for the development and maintenance of road infrastructure
 Management of traffic on the national roads
 Protection of road monuments
 Performing the tasks associated with preparing and coordinating the construction and operation of paid motorways
 Managing payment for transit in accordance with the provisions of paid highways and the National Fund for traffic.

References

External links 
 Archived official website 
 Currently official website 

Government agencies of Poland
Transport organisations based in Poland
Road authorities